Luke Davies is a Welsh rugby union player, currently playing for United Rugby Championship and European Rugby Champions Cup side Scarlets. His preferred position is scrum-half.

Scarlets
Davies was named in the Scarlets squad for the 2021–22 season. He made his debut for the Scarlets in Round 5 of the 2021–22 United Rugby Championship against .

References

Living people
Welsh rugby union players
Scarlets players
Rugby union scrum-halves
Rugby union players from Carmarthen
Year of birth missing (living people)